Parliamentary elections were held in Guinea on 30 June 2002 after several postponements, over two years after it was originally scheduled to be held. The result was a victory for President Lansana Conté's Unity and Progress Party, which won 85 of the 114 seats.

Radical opposition parties, including the Guinean People's Rally (RPG) and the Union of Forces for the Republic, chose to boycott the elections, believing that they would be a farce.

Results
The PUP won all 38 single-member constituency seats and 47 proportional representation seats. In addition to the 85 seats won by the PUP, the Democratic Party of Guinea (PDG) and the National Alliance for Progress (ANP), which also supported President Conté, won a few seats (three for the PDG, one for the ANP). The opposition Union for the Progress of Guinea (UPG) disputed the results and refused to take up the three seats that it won.

References

Elections in Guinea
Guinea
2002 in Guinea
Election and referendum articles with incomplete results